{{Infobox television
| image          = In the Night Garden logo.png
| starring       = 
| creator        = Andrew Davenport
| producer       = 
| runtime        = 30 minutes approx
| developer      = 
| company        = Ragdoll Productions
| distributor    = BBC Worldwide
| narrated       = Derek Jacobi
| composer       = Andrew Davenport
| country        = United Kingdom
| num_episodes   = 100
| list_episodes  = List of In the Night Garden... episodes
| language       = English
| num_series     = 2
| network        = 
| picture_format = 16:9
| first_aired    = 
| last_aired     = 
| related        = {{ubl|Teletubbies|Rosie and Jim}}
 
| channel        = 
}}In the Night Garden... is a British children's television series, aimed at children aged from one to six years old. It is produced by Ragdoll Productions. Andrew Davenport created, wrote and composed the title theme and incidental music for all 100 episodes. It was produced by Davenport and Anne Wood, the team that also co-created Teletubbies. The programme is narrated by Derek Jacobi. It is filmed mostly in live-action and features a mix of actors in costume, stop-motion, puppetry and CGI animation. The characters include Igglepiggle, Upsy Daisy, Makka Pakka, the Tombliboos, the Pontipines, the Wottingers, the Haahoos, the Ninky Nonk, the Pinky Ponk, the Ball and the Tittifers.

Production 

Andrew Davenport has stated in an interview from the Guardian that the key inspiration for the series was his own dream world as a child. This started coming into place in 2004 when Davenport created sketches for the characters of Igglepiggle, Upsy Daisy and Makka Pakka. The series would go on to be publicly announced a year later, and filming would eventually start in early 2005.

Tons of blue screen sets would be constructed for use on the show. Backdrops would be used as well and would come in the form of a modified video of an actual forest claimed to be "somewhere outside Stratford upon Avon". Hundreds of props would be built too: the majority were spherical flowers resembling pom-poms as well as several types of oversized oval-shaped stones.

The constant usage of gigantic inflatable structures, hundreds of props, tons of sets, expensive chroma key, heavy costumes and radio controlled vehicles meant for an estimated amount of £145,000 per episode.

Overview
The show features a large cast of colourful characters with unusual names who live in a magical forest scattered with large daisies and brightly CGI-coloured flowers. The characters mostly speak short and repetitive phrases and each one has its own special song and dance. The garden is a sunny and colourful environment and the music is jaunty and music box-like. According to Wood: 

Each episode starts with a shot of a night sky with the stars appearing, followed by a shot of a child in bed, while the narrator introduces the programme's episode. The scene then cuts to Igglepiggle, in his boat, getting ready to travel to the Night Garden whilst the theme music plays. The camera pans up to the night sky, followed by brightly coloured flowers. Then we see Igglepiggle going to the gazebo to meet his friends. After that, the title appears on or under a hedge and either the Ninky Nonk or the Pinky Ponk appears.

The episodes end with the Tittifers singing their song (they also sing in between segments), and then one character gets ready to go to sleep. At the same time, they hear a bedtime story, which is generated by the magical gazebo that sits at the centre of the Night Garden. This story is a summary of the plot of the episode. Sometimes the characters all dance together under the Gazebo. Then we see all the characters except for Igglepiggle going to sleep, while Igglepiggle delivers his goodbye sequence. Then the Night Garden turns and retreats into the night sky and Igglepiggle is seen asleep on his boat as the end credits roll over.In the Night Garden... is intended to help children relax and achieve calming relationships with their parents. Producer Anne Wood also states: "We became very aware of the anxiety surrounding the care of young children which manifested itself in all kinds of directions, but the one big subject that came up, again and again, was bedtime. It's the classical time for tension between children who want to stay up and parents who want them to go to bed. So this is a programme about calming things down whereas most children's TV is about getting everything up."

In 2007 and 2008, the show won the Children's BAFTA for "Pre-school live-action," as well as being nominated in 2009.

 Episodes 
Season 1 (2007 – 2008)

Season 2 (2008 – 2009)

Cast

 Derek Jacobi  as Narrator
 Nick Kellington as Igglepiggle
 Rebecca Hyland as Upsy Daisy
 Justyn Towler as Makka Pakka
 Andy Wareham as Tombliboo Unn
 Isaac Blake (Series 1)/Holly Denoon (Series 2) as Tombliboo Ooo
 Elisa Laghi as Tombliboo Eee

Critics
One parent petitioner was quoted by The Daily Telegraph commenting: "My four-year-old refused to believe it was bedtime because In the Night Garden... hadn't been on and it was daylight outside.", this is because the show was removed from CBeebies's Bedtime Hour for a while in 2008.

Telecast and home media
In the United Kingdom, In the Night Garden... was first aired on 19 March 2007 until its final episode ended on 6 March 2009. Until 29 March 2008, the show aired on the CBeebies channel every day, including weekends, at 6.25 pm in the "Bedtime Hour" slot, in addition to earlier 11 am showings on BBC Two on weekday mornings. From 29 March until 29 August 2008, In The Night Garden... was removed from its 6:25 pm "Bedtime Hour" slot, which resulted in a nationwide fan petition outside the BBC's Television Centre studios asking for the programme to be re-instated to its normal slot. The show returned to the daily "Bedtime Hour" slot at 6.20 pm as of 30 August 2008 and began showing the second series (beginning with "Slow Down Everybody") on 1 September 2008.To this day, the show remains in the 6:20 slot and is traditionally the last   full-length program of the day before the bedtime story segment.

DVDs

Several Region 2 DVDs have been released in the United Kingdom by BBC Worldwide since October 2007:

The boxset, Hello Everybody! includes "Hello Igglepiggle", "Hello Upsy Daisy", "Hello Makka Pakka", & "Hello Tombliboos"

 Awards and nominations 
 BAFTA Children's Awards 2007
 Awarded Best Children's Live-Action Series
 The website for the programme was nominated for Best Interactive Site BAFTA Children's Awards 2008
 Awarded Best Pre-School Live Action Series
 BAFTA Children's Awards 2009
 Nominated for Best Pre-School Live ActionMerchandisingIn the Night Garden... has books, DVDs, toys and magazines that have been marketed since 2007.

Books
In 2007, Ladybird Books published a full In the Night Garden range of books, some had lifted the flap features (The Prettiest Flower, 2007) and some had sounds from the programme (What a Noisy Pinky Ponk!, 2009), these usually retailed for £8.99 when they were released from BBC Books/Ragdoll Productions.

Toys

The show's producers, Ragdoll Productions, signed a deal to make the toy producer Hasbro a global partner before the show was first aired and merchandise was first made available in July 2007. The range includes small Igglepiggle, Upsy Daisy and Makka Pakka stuffed toys and a small Ninky Nonk train with detachable carriages. Wheeled toy licensee MV Sports & Leisure Limited produced a range of scooters and trikes. Play-Doh made some dough that came packaged with an Igglepiggle-shaped cut-out.

In the spring of 2008, several new toys arrived, including roll-along characters, Talking Cuddly Makka Pakka, Ninky Nonk Pop-up tent and more. Hasbro won the 2008 "Best Licensed Toy or Game range" Licensing Award for their In The Night Garden... range.

In January 2009, a spokesman for the BBC confirmed that they had asked Hasbro to change the CGI skin colour of the Upsy Daisy CGI doll following "a handful of complaints". The doll was originally released with a noticeably lighter complexion than seen in the television series, as it was based on the animated version of Upsy Daisy.

In 2010, more new toys were released like the Igglepiggle and Upsy Daisy set that contained a copy of the Series 2 episode The Pontipines' Picnic (2008) on DVD as well as an electronic Ninky Nonk (which made the actual sounds from the Show) and a Playmat that had: the Bridge, the Tombliboo Bush (with The Tombliboos and their beds), the Gazebo and the Pinky Ponk.

A different company, Golden Bear Toys have also made a range of In The Night Garden... toys, featuring Upsy Daisy and Igglepiggle. These include the "Musical Ninky Nonk Bubble Train" and the "Igglepiggle Wind-up Musical Boat."

On 1 October 2019, the "In the Night Garden Igglepiggle Peek-a-boo Clip-on Toy" made by Golden Bear Toys was recalled due to a possible choking hazard to young children.

Live theatrical showIn the Night Garden...Live! started a UK tour in July 2010. The show took place in an inflatable purpose-built show dome. The show premiered in Liverpool and moved on to London, Glasgow and Birmingham. In the Night Garden Live has toured the United Kingdom every summer.

ZinkyZonk Specials
A spin-off special series, titled In the Night Garden... ZinkyZonk Specials'' was announced by WildBrain in September 2022. The six 15-minute specials are animated in Canada by WildBrain Studios, with an initial broadcast deal made with Hop! Channel in Israel. The series first premiered in Australia on ABC Kids in September 2022.

The specials centre on a brand new character called the Zonk, who sends the characters off to the magical world of the ZonkeyZoney so they can relax in peace. The series is fully animated in 3D CGI animation, unlike the original series which was live-action.

References

External links
 
In the Night Garden on Cbeebies
In the Night Garden official site
 

BBC children's television shows
Treehouse TV original programming
2007 British television series debuts
2009 British television series endings
2000s British children's television series
British preschool education television series
British television series with live action and animation
British television shows featuring puppetry
2000s preschool education television series
Television series by DHX Media
Television series by Ragdoll Productions
English-language television shows
CBeebies